Feuchy is a commune in the Pas-de-Calais department in the Hauts-de-France region of France. It is a small village, with a little more than 1000 inhabitants, and had only about 500 inhabitants in 1914. It is situated two kilometers east of Arras. During World War I, in 1914, it was occupied by German troops. British troops took over the Arras sector in March 1916. On April 9, 1917, the British operation "big push" led to advancement of several miles to the east in a battle with one with the most casualties per day, and Feuchy was liberated. The German offensives placed Feuchy under their control in 1918 until the Canadians cleared the area in August 1918. The population of Feuchy was evacuated and the village was completely destroyed.

Geography
Feuchy knows an important development thanks to this road infrastructure.

Population

Its inhabitants are called "Feuchyssois". Feuchy has two schools.

Places of interest
 The church of St. Vaast, rebuilt along with most of the commune, after World War I.
 The Commonwealth War Graves Commission cemetery.

See also
Communes of the Pas-de-Calais department

References

External links

 Official website of the Commune de Feuchy 
 Feuchy during the First World War 
 The CWGC cemetery at Feuchy

Communes of Pas-de-Calais